During the 17th century, there were two Manchu invasions of Korea:

Later Jin invasion of Joseon (1627)
Qing invasion of Joseon (1636 – 1637)